Offices pursued–successfully and unsuccessfully–by Edmund Muskie, the 58th United States Secretary of State, United States Senator from Maine, 64th Governor of Maine, and Member of the Maine House of Representatives from the 110th district.

1954 Maine Governor

1956 Maine Governor

1958 United States Senate
Edmund Muskie (D) 60.8%
Frederick G. Payne (R) (inc.) 39.2%

1964 United States Senate
Edmund Muskie (D) (inc.) 66%
Clifford G. McIntire (R) 33%

1968 United States Vice President
Spiro Agnew (R) 43.42%
Edmund Muskie (D) 42.72%
Curtis LeMay (American Independent Party) 13.53%

1970 United States Senate
Edmund Muskie (D) (inc.) 61.9%
Neil S. Bishop (R) 38.3%

1972 United States President

Democratic convention: Presidential votes
George McGovern 1864.95 delegates
Henry M. Jackson 525
George Wallace 381.7
Shirley Chisholm 151.95
Terry Sanford 77.5
Hubert Humphrey 66.7
Wilbur Mills 33.8
Edmund Muskie 24.3
Edward M. Kennedy 12.7
Sam Yorty 10
Wayne Hays 5
John Lindsay 5
Fred Harris 2
Eugene McCarthy 2
Walter Mondale 2
Ramsey Clark, Walter Fauntroy, Vance Hartke, Harold Hughes and Patsy Mink 1 each

Democratic convention: Vice Presidential votes
Thomas F. Eagleton 1741.81
Frances Farenthold 404.04
Mike Gravel 225.38
Endicott Peabody 107.26
Claiborne W. Smothers 74
Birch Bayh 62
Peter Rodino 56.5
Jimmy Carter 30
Shirley Chisholm 20
Moon Landrieu 18.5
Edward T. Breathitt 18
 Edward M. Kennedy 15
 Fred Harris 14
 Richard G. Hatcher 11
 Harold E. Hughes 10
 Joseph M. Montoya 9
 William L. Guy 8
 Adlai E. Stevenson III 8
 Three others: 5 votes each
 Five others: 4 votes each
 Five others: 3 votes each
 Edmund Muskie 2 votes
 Eight others: 2 votes each
 Thirty-seven others: 1 vote each
 Four others: shared 88.49 votes

1976 United States Senate
Edmund Muskie (D) (inc.) 60.8%
 Robert A. G. Monks (R) 38.2%

References

Muskie, Edmund